Typhoon Vicki, known in the Philippines as Typhoon Gading, was a typhoon that was notable for having a strange eastward-northeastward track through the Philippines and Japan. The eleventh tropical depression, seventh named tropical storm and fourth typhoon of the inactive 1998 Pacific typhoon season, Vicki originated from an area of disturbed weather in the South China Sea.

Meteorological history

On September 17, a tropical disturbance formed at South China Sea west of Luzon. It intensified quickly and was named Vicki, eventually attaining typhoon status a day after it formed. Unusual for a Pacific typhoon, the system moved eastward and crossed Luzon on September 18, bringing squally conditions to most parts of the island. After that, Vicki then moved northeast, and eventually made landfall on September 22 at the Kii Peninsula in Japan.

Impact
In all, 108 people were killed and 10 others were listed as missing. Damages from the storm amounted to $1.86 billion.

Philippines
 Typhoon Vicki, while moving eastward through northern Luzon, dropped torrential rainfall, killing 9 people and affecting more than 300,000 people. The ferry MV Princess of the Orient sank during the storm's onslaught, killing 70 and leaving 80 others missing and presumed dead. The ferry sank near Fortune Island in the Verde Island Passage.

Japan
Vicki continued northeastward and hit southern Japan killing two women in Nara prefecture, damaging Kasuga Grand Shrine in Nara city and the five-storied pagoda at Muro temple, disrupting train and passenger service and cancelling over 60 domestic flights in the country.

See also
 Tropical cyclones in 1998
 Tropical Storm Linfa (2003) – a strong tropical storm that nearly replicated Vicki's path 5 years later
 Tropical Storm Halong (2008) – another relatively strong storm which also took a similar trajectory to Vicki ten years later
 Typhoon Chan-hom (2009) – a typhoon that also moved eastward and made landfall in northern Luzon

References

External links

1998 Pacific typhoon season
1998 in Japan
Typhoons in Japan
Typhoons in the Philippines
1998 in the Philippines